Events in the year 1932 in Norway.

Incumbents
Monarch – Haakon VII
Prime Minister – Peder Kolstad, until death in March

Events
12 July – Norway annexes King Frederick VI Coast in Greenland.

Popular culture

Sports

Music

Film

Literature

Births

January to March
 

7 January – Tormod Knutsen, Nordic combined skier and Olympic gold medallist (died 2021).
11 January – Arne Barhaugen, Nordic combined skier (died 2008)
19 January – Knut Korsæth, educator, sports official and politician
20 January – Alv Jakob Fostervoll, politician and Minister (died 2015)
20 January – Finn Alnæs, novelist (died 1991).
12 February – 
Princess Astrid of Norway
Axel Jensen, author and poet (died 2003)
Kristian Lund, military officer, engineer and politician (died 2012).
1 March – Kåre Berg, professor in medical genetics (died 2009)
4 March – Sigurd Jansen, composer, pianist and conductor
8 March – Per Høybråten, politician (died 1990)
15 March – Sølvi Sogner, historian (died 2017).

April to June
2 April – Hroar Elvenes, speed skater
30 April – Kjell Hanssen, politician
5 May – Børt-Erik Thoresen, television host and folk singer
8 May – Astrid Murberg Martinsen, politician
11 May – Ingrid Schjelderup, politician
31 May – Astrid Folstad, actress (died 2009)
4 June – Torstein Tynning, politician (died 2000)
5 June – Helga Haugen, politician
12 June – Per Ditlev-Simonsen, politician and Minister
13 June – Kari Risvik, translator (died 2021).
19 June – Karstein Hansen, politician
22 June – Dagfinn Føllesdal, professor of philosophy
22 June – Ove Kristian Sundberg, church musician, musicologist and historian of ideas (died 2019).

July to September
24 July – Ruth Ryste, politician
26 July – Knut Bjørnsen, sports commentator and journalist (died 2008)
4 August – Olav Angell, poet, novelist and translator
6 August – Kjartan Slettemark, artist (died 2008).
8 August – Leif Arne Heløe, politician and Minister
26 August – Asgeir Dølplads, ski jumper
30 August – Ottar Brox, social scientist and politician
6 September – Arve Hans Otterlei, politician

October to December
3 October – Bengt Calmeyer, journalist and novelist. 
5 October – Kari Rasmussen, singer and actress (died 2021).
7 October – Helge Stalsberg, physician
8 October – Per Theodor Haugen, actor
12 November – Magne Lystad, orienteering champion (died 1999)
12 December – Asbjørn Jordahl, politician and Minister
16 December – Kjell Heggelund, literary researcher, lecturer, editor, poet, translator and literary critic (died 2017).
26 December – Oluf Skarpnes, jurist (died 2019)

Deaths

5 March – Peder Kolstad, politician and Prime Minister of Norway (born 1878)
17 March – Georg Brustad, gymnast and Olympic bronze medallist (born 1892)
5 April – Kristian Friis Petersen, politician and Minister (born 1867)
19 April – Lars Oftedal, politician and Minister (born 1877)
28 May – Ejnar Torgensen, sailor and Olympic silver medallist (born 1900)
26 August – Edvard Bull, Sr., historian and politician (born 1881)
16 December – Albert Gran, actor (born 1862)
24 December – Eyvind Alnæs, composer, pianist, organist and choir director (born 1872)

Full date unknown
Simon Christian Hammer, writer and journalist (born 1866)

See also

References

External links